William Adam (27 Januari 1909, The Hague – 3 November 1988, Brussels) was a Dutch / Belgian malacologist who specialised in cephalopods. Adam described a number of cuttlefish and bobtail squid species, including Euprymna hoylei, Sepia cottoni, Sepia dollfusi, Sepia dubia, Sepia reesi, Sepia sewelli, Sepia thurstoni, Sepia vercoi,  and Sepiola knudseni.

Adam was born as the son of Constance Jeannette Barkhuijsen and the merchant sailor William Adam. After his schooling in The Hague he visited Java in 1926-27. Upon his return home he studied biology at Utrecht University, obtaining his PhD in 1933 with a dissertation on terrestrial mollusk glands. He then took a position at the Museum of Natural Sciences in Brussels, where he climbed the ranks. In 1952 he became a Belgian citizen.
In 1957 Adam became correspondent of the Royal Netherlands Academy of Arts and Sciences.

References

1909 births
1988 deaths
Belgian curators
Belgian malacologists
Belgian zoologists
Dutch curators
Dutch malacologists
20th-century Dutch zoologists
Teuthologists
Members of the Royal Netherlands Academy of Arts and Sciences
Commanders of the Order of the Crown (Belgium)
Officers of the Order of Leopold II
Scientists from The Hague
Utrecht University alumni
Academic staff of the University of Antwerp
Dutch emigrants to Belgium